Carey Wilber (June 26, 1916 – May 2, 1998) was an American journalist and television writer born in Buffalo, New York. He began his career in the live days of television, and wrote for a variety of programs over the next three decades, including Captain Video and His Video Rangers, The Asphalt Jungle,  Lost In Space, The Time Tunnel, Bonanza, and Maverick. Wilber wrote the "Ice Princess" storyline for the daytime serial General Hospital in 1981.  He died in Seattle, Washington.

Star Trek
Wilber wrote the original story for, and co-wrote the teleplay of, the Star Trek episode "Space Seed."  The general plot had originally been created by Wilber for the series Captain Video and His Video Rangers, which featured humans from Ancient Greece who were preserved in cryogenic suspension and resurrected. During the conception and writing of the episode numerous changes were made as producer Bob Justman felt that it would be too expensive to film. Despite this, and due to the support of NBC executives, Justman gave a series of notes to Wilber for him to redraft the proposal. Eventually it was passed to Gene L. Coon to revise, and the final draft was also revised by series creator Gene Roddenberry. These revisions include the marooning of the criminals at the end of the episode, and the change of the primary villain from a Nordic character to a Sikh. Roddenberry attempted to claim the primary writing credit for "Space Seed", a request that was turned down by the Writers Guild of America.

Filmography

Films

Television

References

External links

Writers from Buffalo, New York
1916 births
1998 deaths